In the mathematical subfield of graph theory, a centered tree is a tree with only one center, and a bicentered tree is a tree with two centers.

A center of a graph is a vertex with minimal eccentricity. A graph can have an arbitrary number of centers. However,  has proved that for trees, there are only two possibilities:
 The tree has precisely one center (centered trees).
 The tree has precisely two centers (bicentered trees). In this case, the two centers are adjacent.
A proof of this fact is given, for example, by Harary.

Notes

References

External links
 
 

Trees (graph theory)